The Guru Nanak Dev Thermal Plant at Bathinda was one of the three coal-fired thermal power stations in Punjab (the other being at Lehra Mohabat and Ropar). 
It was a medium-sized power station with four units that were begun to be built in early 1970s and completed in 1982. All total generate up to 460 MW (2x110+2x120 MW) of power that meets the irrigation needs of lower Punjab. Having generated electricity to meet the power demand of Punjab, the thermal plant shut down indefinitely on September 27, 2017.

The plant was named after the first Sikh guru and founder of Sikhism, Guru Nanak.

Capacity
It had an installed capacity of 440 MW. All four units ceased operations in September 2017

See also
 List of places named after Guru Nanak Dev

References

External links
 Indo-German Power Aggrements
 Lecture by Dr. S. Banerjee on Power Generation in India
 Thermal Plant as seen from Muktsar Road

Coal-fired power stations in Punjab, India
Bathinda district
Memorials to Guru Nanak
Energy infrastructure completed in 2010
2010 establishments in Punjab, India